Antonis Samarakis (August 16, 1919 in Athens – August 8, 2003 in Pylos) was a Greek writer of the post-war generation. His work explores themes related to humanism, the dangers of totalitarianism and alienation.

References

1919 births
2003 deaths
Writers from Athens
Greek male writers